David Louis Opfar (born January 16, 1960) is an American football coach and former player. He was the defensive coordinator at Duquesne University from 2010 to 2021. Opfar served as the head football coach at Saint Francis University in Loretto, Pennsylvania from 2002 to 2009, compiling a record of 17–68. Opfar played college football at Penn State and professionally in the United States Football League (USFL) with the Philadelphia/Baltimore Stars in 1984 and 1985 and in the National Football League (NFL) with the Pittsburgh Steelers in 1987.

Head coaching record

References

External links
 Duquesne profile
 

1960 births
Living people
American football defensive tackles
Duquesne Dukes football coaches
National Football League replacement players
Penn State Nittany Lions football coaches
Penn State Nittany Lions football players
Philadelphia/Baltimore Stars players
Pittsburgh Steelers players
Saint Francis Red Flash football coaches
Washington & Jefferson Presidents football coaches
High school football coaches in Pennsylvania
Sportspeople from McKeesport, Pennsylvania
Coaches of American football from Pennsylvania
Players of American football from Pennsylvania